The 2022 Conference USA football season was the 27th season of college football play for Conference USA (C-USA). The season started on August 27, 2022, and is ended on January 31, 2023. The conference consisted of 11 members and was part of the 2022 NCAA Division I FBS football season.

Previous season

The Western Kentucky Hilltoppers won the East Division, while the UTSA Roadrunners won the West Division. In the 2021 Conference USA Football Championship Game, the Roadrunners defeated the Hilltoppers 49-41.

Conference realignment
Prior to the 2022 season, Conference USA shrank to 11 schools, as previous members Marshall, Old Dominion, and Southern Miss all departed to join the Sun Belt Conference as full members. The move was first announced with the release of the Sun Belt's football schedule on March 1, and confirmed on March 29 when C-USA and the three departing schools reached a settlement of a legal dispute over their departure date.

The 2022 season is the last for six schools in the conference. Charlotte, Florida Atlantic, North Texas, Rice, UAB, and UTSA will all leave Conference USA in July 2023 to join the American Athletic Conference. Liberty, New Mexico State, Jacksonville State, and Sam Houston will join Conference USA in 2023 to replace departing members.

Preseason

Recruiting classes

Conference USA media day
The 2022 Conference USA is scheduled for July 27, 2022, at Globe Life Field in Arlington, Texas.

Preseason poll
The preseason poll was released on July 25, 2022.

Preseason player awards
Preseason player awards were announced on July 26.

Offensive Player of the Year: Frank Harris (Redshirt Senior, UTSA quarterback)
Defensive Player of the Year: Rashad Wisdom (Senior, UTSA safety)
Special Teams Player of the Year: Brayden Narveson (Redshirt Junior, Western Kentucky kicker)

Preseason awards
The following list contains C-USA players who were included on preseason watch lists for national awards.

Head coaches
On November 10, 2021, Butch Davis announced that he would not return to FIU after the school declined to extend his contract. On December 9, 2021, FIU announced Mike MacIntyre as the school's new head coach. MacIntyre had previously been a coach in various position both at other collegiate schools and at the NFL level, including being head coach for a time at both San Jose State and Colorado.
On November 26, 2021,  Louisiana Tech announced that they were firing head coach Skip Holtz. Holtz was allowed to coach the final game of the season before being dismissed immediately after. The school announced on November 30, 2021, that Texas Tech offensive coordinator Sonny Cumbie would take over as the new head coach.
On June 24, UAB head coach Bill Clark announced that he was retiring from his position effective August 1 due to chronic health issues dealing with his back. Offensive coordinator Bryant Vincent took over as the interim head coach.

Note: All stats shown are before the start of the 2022 season.

Mid-season changes
On October 23, Charlotte fired head coach Will Healy after a 1–7 start to the season. Offensive line coach Peter Rossomando was named the interim replacement at head coach. On November 15, Charlotte announced that Biff Poggi would take over as the permanent head coach beginning in 2023.

Post-season changes
On November 26, Florida Atlantic announced that they had fired head coach Willie Taggart. Taggart had posted a record of 15–18 over three years at the school. On December 1, Florida Atlantic announced that former Texas head coach Tom Herman would take over as head coach at FAU for the 2023 season.
On November 30, UAB announced that they had hired Trent Dilfer as the new permanent head coach, replacing interim coach Bryant Vincent. Dilfer would begin coaching the team on December 2.
On December 4. North Texas announced that they had fired head coach Seth Littrell. Littrell had posted a 44–44 record with the school in seven years at the school. Defensive coordinator Phil Bennett took over as interim head coach for the Frisco Bowl. On December 13 North Texas announced that Washington State offensive coordinator Eric Morris would take over as head coach.

Rankings

Schedule

All times Eastern time.

Week 0

Week 1

Week 2

Week 3

Week 4

Week 5

Week 6

Week 7

Week 8

Week 9

Week 10 

{{CFB Conference Schedule Entry
| w/l           = 
| date          = November 5
| time          = 3:00 p.m.
| visiting_team = Middle Tennessee
| home_team     = Louisiana Tech| gamename      = 
| site_stadium  = Joe Aillet Stadium
| site_cityst   = Ruston, LA
| tv            = ESPN+
| score         = LT 40–24
| attend        = 14,298
}}

 Week 11 

 Week 12 

 Week 13 

Conference USA Championship Game

Postseason
Bowl Games

Rankings are from AP Poll • All times Eastern Time Zone.

Selection of teamsBowl eligible (6): Middle Tennessee, North Texas, Rice, UAB, UTSA, Western KentuckyBowl-ineligible (5): Charlotte, FIU, Florida Atlantic, Louisiana Tech, UTEP

Conference USA records vs other conferences

2022–2023 records against non-conference foes:

Conference USA vs Power 5 matchups
This is a list of games C-USA has scheduled versus power conference teams (ACC, Big 10, Big 12, Pac-12, BYU, Notre Dame and SEC). All rankings are from the current AP Poll at the time of the game.

Conference USA vs Group of Five matchups
The following games include C-USA teams competing against teams from the American, MAC, Mountain West, or Sun Belt. 

Conference USA vs FBS independents matchups
The following games include C-USA teams competing against FBS Independents, which includes Army, Liberty, New Mexico State, UConn, or UMass.

Conference USA vs FCS matchups

Awards and honors
Player of the week honors

Conference USA Individual Awards
The following individuals received postseason honors as chosen by the league's head coaches.

All-Conference Teams
The following list contains players selected as members of the 2022 All-Conference Teams.

* Denotes Unanimous SelectionAll Conference Honorable Mentions:'All-Americans

The 2022 College Football All-America Team is composed of the following College Football All-American first teams chosen by the following selector organizations: Associated Press (AP), Football Writers Association of America (FWAA), American Football Coaches Association (AFCA), Walter Camp Foundation (WCFF), The Sporting News (TSN), Sports Illustrated (SI), USA Today (USAT) ESPN, CBS Sports (CBS), FOX Sports (FOX) College Football News (CFN), Bleacher Report (BR), Scout.com, Phil Steele (PS), SB Nation (SB), Athlon Sports, Pro Football Focus (PFF) and Yahoo! Sports (Yahoo!).

Currently, the NCAA compiles consensus all-America teams using a point system computed from All-America teams named by coaches associations or media sources.  Players are chosen against other players playing at their position only.  To be selected a consensus All-American, players must be chosen to the first team on at least half of the five official selectors as recognized by the NCAA.  Second- and third-team honors are used to break ties.  Players named first-team by all five selectors are deemed unanimous All-Americans. Currently, the NCAA recognizes All-Americans selected by the AP, AFCA, FWAA, TSN'', and the WCFF to determine consensus and unanimous All-Americans.

NFL Draft

The following list includes all C-USA players who were drafted in the 2023 NFL Draft.

Notes

References

2022 Conference USA football season